Juan Ramos, better known by his stage name Juan Gotti, is an American rapper of Mexican descent, and member of Dope House Records. He raps in both Spanish and English.

Biography
Ramos was raised in Houston, Texas. He later moved to San Antonio. Gotti combines regional Norteño and Ranchero music with hip hop to create his signature sound. Some of Gotti's music was recorded in an attempt to promote peace between rival gangs, as the result of his change of attitude after being released from prison.

His album No Sett Trippin was nominated for a Latin Grammy Award in 2004. In 2005, his follow-up album John Ghetto debuted at #11 on Billboard's Latin Rhythm Charts, as well as #46 under the Top Latin Albums category. He has also received multiple nominations for Texas Latin Rap Awards, including a win for Artist of the Year in 2005.

Discography

Studio albums 
 2002: No Sett Trippin - Dope House Records
 2005: John Ghetto - WEA Latina (#46 Latin, #24 Rap)
 2005: John Ghetto (Deluxe Edition)(CD & DVD) - WEA Latina
 2007: Raza Ville - WEA Latina
 2008: Texas Es Mexico - Atraco Music
 2008: The Chronicles of Juan Ramos - Jake Records
 2011: Ain't No Love - Goldtoes Entertainment
 2011: Fear No Evil - Goldtoes Entertainment
 2011: Dope La Familia (with Carolyn Rodriguez) – Soulyrical Publishing
 2011: Ley De Texas - Virus Enterprises LLC
 2012: Getcho Head Right - Spent Records
 2013: Broken Dreams - Atraco Music
 2014: Makin Moves - (with G Man) – Criminal Mind Records
 2014: Respeto The Album - (with Ice) – Ice House Records
 2015: American Me

Remix albums 
 2002: No Sett Trippin (Slowed & Throwed)
 2005: John Ghetto (Chopped & Screwed)

Mixtapes 
 2003: Underground Vol.1 El Mas Locote Mix
 2004: Underground Vol.2 Off The Chompa
 2005: Underground Vol.3 Mas Locote De La Chingada
 2006: Underground Vol.4 Still Loco

References

External links 
Official MySpace page

Living people
American rappers of Mexican descent
Year of birth missing (living people)
Rappers from Houston
Gangsta rappers
Underground rappers
People from Eagle Pass, Texas
21st-century American rappers